Rosalind Beatrice Rinker (2 April 1906 – 11 January 2002) was a Christian missionary and author.

Rinker was born in New Rockford, North Dakota and served as a missionary in China with the Oriental Mission Society from 1926 to 1940. She then returned to the United States and studied at Asbury College. After her graduation in 1945, she worked as a staff counselor for InterVarsity Christian Fellowship.

Rinker wrote a number of books, including Prayer: Conversing With God (1959) which in 2006 was named by Christianity Today as the most influential book on evangelicals over the last fifty years.

References

People from Eddy County, North Dakota
American Protestant missionaries
Female Christian missionaries
Protestant missionaries in China
1906 births
2002 deaths
Asbury University alumni
American Christian writers
American expatriates in China
American evangelicals